Kevin Roose is the author of three books and a technology columnist for The New York Times. He wrote a book about Liberty University, an evangelical Christian university known for strict rules imposed on students. He was named on Forbes "30 Under 30" list in 2015.

Life and career 

Roose is a graduate of Westtown School and Brown University. He worked as news director at Fusion.

In June 2017, he rejoined The New York Times. His column, "The Shift", focuses on the intersection of technology, business, and culture.

On March 24, 2021, Roose published a column in The New York Times announcing an auction for the column itself to be distributed as an NFT, or non-fungible token, with proceeds going to The New York Times'''s Neediest Cases Fund. The column sold the following day for $560,000.

 Writing 
Roose wrote The Unlikely Disciple while undercover at Liberty University, aiming to explore the culture of life at a fundamental Evangelical university. Roose, raised in a secular and liberal environment, wanted to better understand conservative Christian culture.

Roose's second book, Young Money, follows the beginning of the career of eight financial analysts on Wall Street. It focuses on the difficult and strenuous work environments and what makes the financial industry different after the financial crisis of 2007–08.

Roose's third book, Futureproof: 9 Rules in the Age of Automation, examines how people and organizations can survive in the machine age. To survive, he believes in the need "to focus on the more human skills that machines can't replace."

He earned the 2018 Gerald Loeb Award for Breaking News for the story "Ouster at Uber."

 Other work 
Roose is the host of "Rabbit Hole," an eight-part podcast from The New York Times "examining how the internet is changing us" and cohost of The New York Times podcast "Hard Fork".

 Media appearances 
Roose appeared on The Daily Show with Jon Stewart on February 27, 2014, to discuss Young Money''.

References

External links 
 

21st-century American writers
Brown University alumni
Westtown School alumni
Living people
Gerald Loeb Award winners for Breaking News
Year of birth missing (living people)